Pola Brändle (born April 7, 1980, in Aachen,
Germany) is a German collage/decollage artist who lives and works in Berlin Kreuzberg, Germany.

Life 

Brändle grew up in Aachen, and, after graduating from high school, she joined the Maastricht Academy of Fine Arts, where she earned her Bachelor of Design in 2003. Brändle's final work at the Maastricht Academy of Fine Arts was supported by the "TENT Academy Award" (Rotterdam) together with nine other nominations as best final works in the Netherlands. During her studies Brändle developed her artistic photographic potentials and discovered the fascination of posters and their artistic opportunities for further editing. After living in Portsmouth, Berlin and Lisbon, Brändle moved to the Mediterranean island of Mallorca. In 2012 Bränlde returned to Berlin Kreuzberg, where she now lives and works.

Work 

Brändle follows in the footsteps of the affichistes working with posters from her immediate environment but also collecting material on her travels which provide the bases of her time- and culture-specific artworks. Her work involves both small fragments and large-scale pieces ranging between pop art and abstraction.

Exhibitions (selection)
This is a table of exhibitions of Pola Brändle

 2018: Kunststation Kleinsassen, Kleinsassen, Germany
 2017: Alte Feuerwache - project room, Berlin, Germany
 2016: Haus am Lützowplatz, Berlin, Germany
 2016: Hotel de Rome (Rocco Forte Hotels), Berlin, Germany 
 2015/16: Sunnubraut, Island Biennial, Gardur, Island 
 2015: RDKM, Yalova Biennial, Istanbul & Yalova, Turkey
 2014: Kunstetage K55, Heilbronn, Germany
 2014: MMG Gallery, Budapest, Hungary
 2013: City Museum, Yalova, Turkey
 2010: CoCA - Center of Contemporary Art, Seattle, US

Literature 
 Brändle, Pola: „Plakatief – A World in Layers“; Kerber Verlag, Bielefeld;

See also
 List of German women artists

Notes

External links 

 Pola Brändle's Press Articles
 Pola Braendle on artfacts

1980 births
Living people
German women artists
German poster artists
People from Aachen
German contemporary artists
Women graphic designers
People from Friedrichshain-Kreuzberg
Artists from Berlin